Alan Anatolyevich Khugaev;born 27 April 1989 in Vladikavkaz) is a Russian wrestler of Ossetian origin. He won the gold medal at the 2012 Summer Olympics in the Greco-Roman men's 84 kg event.  After retiring from competing, Khugaev was appointed the U23 Greco-Roman coach for the Russian national team.

References

External links
 

1989 births
Living people
Olympic wrestlers of Russia
Wrestlers at the 2012 Summer Olympics
Olympic gold medalists for Russia
Olympic medalists in wrestling
Sportspeople from Vladikavkaz
Medalists at the 2012 Summer Olympics
Russian male sport wrestlers
Universiade medalists in wrestling
Universiade gold medalists for Russia
European Wrestling Championships medalists
Medalists at the 2013 Summer Universiade
21st-century Russian people